Arthur Cleveland Nash (1871-1969) was an American architect.

He was born in Geneva, New York.  He attended Phillips Exeter Academy.  He studied at Ecole des Beaux-Arts in Paris.  He worked with McKim, Mead and White.

Several of his works are listed on the U.S. National Register of Historic Places.

Works include:
Carolina Inn, built 1923, 211 Pittsboro St. Chapel Hill, North Carolina (Nash, Arthur C.), NRHP-listed
One or more works in Morehead Hill Historic District (boundary increase), includes portions of Arnette, Vickers, Yancey, Parker and Wells Sts. Durham, North Carolina (Nash, Arthur), NRHP-listed
Queen's Castle, NY 414 Lodi, New York (Nash, Arthur), NRHP-listed
 Arthur C. and Mary S.A. Nash House, his personal residence, NRHP-listed
Sherwood-Jayne House, addition to north end added by Nash, 55 Old Post Rd. East Setauket, New York (Nash, Arthur), NRHP-listed

References

Architects from North Carolina
People from Geneva, New York
1871 births
1969 deaths